Constance of Sicily (Hauteville family), Queen of Sicily, was the ruler of Sicily from 1194 until her death in 1198, mother of Frederick I of Sicily.

Constance of Sicily may also refer to:
Constance of Sicily, Queen of Italy, died 1138
Constance of Sicily, Queen of Aragon, (1249–1302)
Constance of Sicily, Queen of Cyprus, (1304–1344)
Constance of Sicily, Regent of Sicily, (1324–1355)

See also
Constance of Aragon (disambiguation)